Lawrence Edward Hughes Sr. (September 18, 1931 – September 1, 2000) was a member of the Ohio House of Representatives. He died in 2000. He is the father of state Senator Jim Hughes.

References

1931 births
2000 deaths
Republican Party members of the Ohio House of Representatives
20th-century American politicians